They Call Me Macho Woman! is a 1989 action film written and directed by Patrick G. Donahue and distributed by Troma Entertainment.

The story follows city woman Susan Morris (Debra Sweaney), who decides to escape her banal urban life and goes looking for a house in the country. Unfortunately, she's taken prisoner by a group of savage drug smugglers, headed by the ruthless Mongo (Brian Oldfield). After escaping their clutches, Susan is forced to transform herself into a fearsome warrior and exact her revenge on Mongo and his evil henchmen.

A lot of the original music in this film became trademark Troma songs and were used in a variety of films, including the Toxic Avenger sequels.

Tagline: Born to shop...she learned to kill!

External links
 
 
 

1989 films
American independent films
Troma Entertainment films
1989 action films
1989 independent films
American action films
1980s English-language films
1980s American films